Adam Marciniak (born 28 September 1988) is a Polish professional footballer who plays as a defender for ŁKS Łódź.

Honours

Club
Arka Gdynia
 Polish Cup: 2016–17
 Polish Supercup: 2017, 2018

References

External links 
 

1988 births
Living people
Polish footballers
Poland under-21 international footballers
Polish expatriate footballers
Górnik Zabrze players
ŁKS Łódź players
Śląsk Wrocław players
MKS Cracovia (football) players
AEK Larnaca FC players
Arka Gdynia players
Ekstraklasa players
Cypriot First Division players
Expatriate footballers in Cyprus
Footballers from Łódź
Association football defenders
Poland international footballers